Child psychotherapy, or mental health interventions for children have developed varied approaches over the last century. Two distinct historic pathways can be identified for present-day provision in Western Europe and in the United States: one through the Child Guidance Movement, the other stemming from adult psychiatry or psychological medicine, which evolved a separate child psychiatry specialism.

Terms describing child-focused treatments may vary from one part of the world to another, with particular differences in the use of such terms, as "therapy", "child psychotherapy" or "child analysis".

Psychoanalytic child psychotherapy
Psychoanalytic psychotherapy with infants, children and adolescents is mainly delivered by people qualified specifically in psychoanalytic child psychotherapy, or by trainees under supervision from a specialist in child-focused treatment. Recent evidence, covering 34 research papers (nine of which were randomized controlled trials) showed psychoanalytic psychotherapy to be particularly effective for children with the following conditions:
 depression
 anxiety and behavior disorders
 personality disorders
 learning difficulties
 eating disorders
 developmental issues

Furthermore, follow-up research shows that in psychoanalytic psychotherapy, therapeutic improvements continue well beyond the termination of the therapy itself. This has been termed a, "sleeper effect."

In the UK, psychoanalytic psychotherapy is recommended by NICE as an evidence-based treatment for trauma from sexual abuse and severe depression in adolescents following the IMPACT study

Evidence-based child and adolescent psychiatry
There are various therapeutic assessments to address mental health concerns among children and adolescents. Some approaches are backed by strong scientific evidence, while some are not. Some research suggests that it is the quality of the relationship with the therapist, rather than the particular form of therapeutic intervention, that is the strongest factor in helping change develop.

Parent–infant psychotherapy
If the normal course of secure attachment between parent and infant is disrupted, parent–infant psychotherapy is a catch-all term to describe psychotherapies that either aim to restore this bond or to work with vulnerable parents to overcome disruption and prevent further occurrence. Examples of this kind of therapy include, "Watch, Wait, Wonder," and psychoanalytic parent-infant psychotherapy. Many of these techniques require a three-way relationship between the parent, child, and therapist. During therapy sessions, the parent may express his or her thoughts and feelings which are based on a combination of factors including:

 The parent's experiences as a child
 The parent's expectations and hopes for the child's future
 The relationships the parent has with other people

The therapist's role is as an observer and an interpreter of the interaction between the infant and the parent. He might share some of his thoughts about the behavior of the child with the parent and by doing so offering the parent an alternative way of experiencing the child. This technique helps the parent to resolve issues with his or her own infancy-experiences in order to restore secure attachment with the infant. And it helps lower the risk for psychopathological developments of the child in the future.

Group art therapy 
Group art therapy gives the child a safe environment to access their emotions through a creative medium in the presence of a therapist. This nonverbal therapeutic practice alleviates the stress that a child may feel when trying to find the words to express themselves; thus it helps rebuild social skills and gain trust in others. Studies have also found that this practice can alleviate self-harm engagement. This method of psychotherapy has been found particularly helpful for children who exhibit any of the following:
 Autism
 Asperger's
 Anxiety and behavior disorders

Group art therapy has eight subcategories of specific mechanisms of change. Among them are:

 As a form of expression to reveal what's inside
 As a way of becoming aware of oneself
 a way to form a narrative of life
 integrative activation of the brain through experience
 a form of exploration and/or reflection
 the specifics of the art materials/techniques offered in art therapy
 as a form to practice and/or learn skills
 art therapy as an easily accessible, positive and safe intervention by the use of art materials

By bundling together these specific groups, the general groups are as follows:
 art therapy as a form of group process
 the therapeutic alliance in art therapy

Within this approach, three types of behaviors can be exhibited by the therapist; non-directive, directive, and eclectic. Non-directive refers to a following behavior in which the therapist takes on an attitude of observing self-exploration of emotions rather than facilitation or interpretation. Directive attitudes however follow a facilitative pattern by asking specific questions to guide the clients artwork. With these two processes in mind, eclectic combines them to create a facilitative and lenient approach simultaneously and often utilizes emotion check-in's at the start of sessions, and emotion check-outs at the end of sessions.

This approach adopts various psychological elements such as psycho-educational, mindfulness, psychoanalysis, and cognitive analytic theories. This article sought to analyze this methods effectiveness on a broad spectrum, including the following:
 traumatic events (PTSD)
 who have educational needs or disabilities
 children with medical conditions
 children with none of the former
 juvenile offenders

Art therapy can be implemented as a holistic therapeutic practice for child cancer patients as well (effecting 1 in 285 children in the US; 15,980 children each year). Given the alleviating effects that are addressed by this method, children were better able to discuss their needs and emotions to their family members and healthcare team. The results of this study conveyed that art therapy lead to improved emotional and mental well-being and improved communication skills.

Parent–child interaction therapy (PCIT) 
This approach is meant to assist parents whom have children ages 2–7 years old who are prone to disruptive behaviors and emotional difficulties. Parent–child therapy utilizing two stages, each possessing their own goals and characteristics to create this approach. Beginning with child-directed interaction (CDI), parents learn skills such as praise, verbal reflection, imitation, behavioral description, and enjoyment, to achieve the goal of warm and secure parenting styles. Parent-Directed interaction (PDI), the second phase, seeks to decrease the original disruptive behaviors exhibited by the child. Both phases are designed to be coached by the therapist via another room while the parent interacts with their child.  This review found that certain cultural values may impede or contribute to the progress of this approach.

See also
 British Psychotherapy Foundation
 Michael Fordham
 Anna Freud
 Melanie Klein
 Michael Rutter
 Donald Winnicott

References

External links
 Association of Child Psychotherapists (ACP) the professional body for Psychoanalytic Child and Adolescent Psychotherapists in the UK and a core NHS profession

 
Child development
Transdisciplinarity
Child welfare
Psychotherapy